A list of films released in the Soviet Union in 1931 (see 1931 in film).

See also
1931 in the Soviet Union

External links
 Soviet films of 1931 at the Internet Movie Database

1931
Soviet
Films